Umar Nazarovich Kremlev (Russian: Умар Назарович Кремлёв; born as Umar Nazarovich Lutfuloev (Russian: Умар Назарович Лутфуллоев) on November 1, 1982 in Serpukhov) is a Russian sports functionary who is serving as the President of the International Boxing Association (IBA). He has been Secretary General and Member of the Executive Committee of the Boxing Federation of Russia since February 2017.

Biography 
Kremlev received higher education at Moscow State Academy of Public Utilities and Construction. It is claimed that Kremlev worked in a transport company Transstroykom LLC and from 2009 to 2012 he served as President of Center for Strategic Development and Modernization.

Has been involved in boxing since his youth. Until July 2017, he was Head of Patriot Boxing Promotions and worked with such leading boxers as Roy Jones Jr., Fedor Chudinov, Dmitry Chudinov and Mikhail Aloyan. Now he is working at the Boxing Progress Center in Moscow.

On 1 February 2017, Kremlev became General Secretary and Member of the Executive Committee of the Russian Boxing Federation. He took part in the organization of world boxing events such as the Murat Gassiev-Junier Dorticos World Boxing Super Series semi-final and Oleksandr Usyk-Murat Gassiev World Boxing Super Series final, as well as the 2019 AIBA Men's and Women's World Championships hosted by the cities of Yekaterinburg and Ulan-Ude, Russia. He pioneered the celebration of Boxing Day in Russia which on 8 February 2019 became an international holiday celebrated worldwide on July 22. He also initiated Global Boxing Forums which took place on February 1–4, 2018 in Sochi and on June 12–16, 2019 in Yekaterinburg.

On 3 November 2018, Kremlev was elected by a majority of votes (63 votes) to the Executive Committee of the International Boxing Association (AIBA, later IBA) at the AIBA Congress in Moscow and thus became the first Russian to be nominated Member of AIBA Executive Committee.

On 23 February 2019, he was elected First Vice-President of the European Boxing Confederation (EUBC) by a majority of votes (25 out of 40) at the EUBC General Assembly held in Moscow.

On 21 November 2019, Kremlev was nominated as Chairman of AIBA Marketing Commission at the AIBA Extraordinary Executive Committee Meeting; he later organized AIBA Continental Forums for the countries of the Americas, Oceania and Asia in 2020.

He won a vote of 57.33 per cent to replace Mohamed Moustahsane of Morocco to serve as AIBA's President, on 12 December 2020. The election was held virtually at AIBA’s ongoing congress due to the COVID-19 pandemic. It was attended by 155 National Federations from five continents.

The International Olympic Committee (IOC) has been concerned about the IBA under Kremlev's leadership. Kremlev has ties to Vladimir Putin, has moved much of the IBA's operations from Lausanne, Switzerland to Russia, has spent heavily on apparent self-promotion, and has opposed independent appointment of judges and referees. The IOC has also been alarmed by the fact that the IBA's only sponsor is a Russian company that supports the Russian invasion of Ukraine. In September 2022, the IBA voted against a presidential election, cementing Kremlev's position as the organization's president.

Awards 
Umar Kremlev was awarded Medal of the Order "For Merit to the Fatherland”, II degree (on 11 March 2020) for a great contribution to the development of physical culture and sport and diligent work.

According to Kremlev, he was awarded with the Certificate of Honor of President of the Russian Federation, the medal "25 years since the establishment of the Presidential Security Service", received gratitude from President of the Russian Federation "for many years of diligent work and active social activities" and the Cross of the International Order of St. George Glory.

References

1982 births
Living people
People from Serpukhov
Russian sports executives and administrators
Boxing in Russia
Recipients of the Medal of the Order "For Merit to the Fatherland" II class